The Student Press Law Center (SPLC) is a non-profit organization in the United States that aims to protect press freedom rights for student journalists at high school and university student newspapers. It is dedicated to student free-press rights and provides information, advice and legal assistance at no charge for students and educators.

The SPLC was founded in 1974. The Kennedy Memorial Foundation and the Reporters Committee for Freedom of the Press created the center at the recommendation of the Commission of Inquiry into High School Journalism. The center became a separate corporation in 1979. It is the only legal assistance agency in the United States with the primary mission of educating high school and college journalists about the rights and responsibilities embodied in the First Amendment and supporting the freedom of expression of student news media to address issues and express themselves free from censorship.

The SPLC is a non-partisan 501(c)(3) corporation. It is headquartered in the University of California Building in Washington, D.C. It was previously headquartered in Arlington, Virginia, where it shared a suite of offices with the Reporters Committee for Freedom of the Press.

Services
The SPLC:
Provides free legal help and information as well as low-cost educational materials for student journalists on a wide variety of media law topics, including laws regarding defamation, freedom of information, copyrights, invasion of privacy, reporter's privilege, obscenity, censorship, and the First Amendment. 
Files amici curiae in cases where student media rights could be effected.
Operates an Attorney Referral Network of approximately 250 volunteer media law attorneys across the country who may be available to provide free legal representation to local students when necessary.
Maintains a free Freedom of Information Law Letter Generator that creates a public records request tailored to the law of each of the 50 states and the District of Columbia, for use by student journalists and others seeking access to public records.
Staffs a legal representation hotline.
Maintains a full-service news operation covering issues relevant to student journalism. The center's journalists write online news stories about ongoing censorship and open-records controversies, and produce the in-depth SPLC Report magazine in print and online.
Presents annual awards to recognize student journalists, educators, and administrators that have shown courage in standing up for student press freedom.

Advocacy
The SPLC has advocated for the passage of "New Voices" legislation at the state level to protect student journalists' rights. Its efforts led to proposed legislation in ten states: in Hawaii, Kentucky, Missouri, Nebraska, New Jersey, New York, Iowa, Tennessee, West Virginia, and Texas. The organization has promoted and funded Student Press Freedom Day on college campuses. In 2019, it awarded four students journalists a "Courage in Student Journalism Award". The award was given in conjunction with the Center for Scholastic Journalism at Kent State University and the National Scholastic Press Association.

In 2015, the SPLC aided Prosper High School student journalists who were censored and removed from their student newspaper after reporting on a teacher criticizing their colleague for reporting a school-related incident of inappropriate sexual conduct to police.

In 2018, the law center supported two student reporters whose high school administration shut down their student newspaper when their investigating revealed a teacher was fired for exchanging inappropriate text messages with an underage student.

In 2021, attorneys from the Student Press Law Center, alongside other free-speech groups, gave an amicus curiae in the supreme court case Mahanoy Area School District v. B.L. which stated the court had unconstitutionally established students as second-class citizens as a consequence of school enrollment.

Newspaper theft 
The organization tracks the theft of free newspapers on college campuses. The group considers the disappearance of the student newspapers as censorship by theft.

Governance and staff
The SPLC is run by an executive director and a board of directors composed primarily of attorneys, professional journalists and journalism educators. The current executive director, Hadar Harris, was named to the position in September 2017. The previous executive director was Frank LoMonte, who served from January 2008 until September 2017. He was preceded by Mark Goodman, who served from 1985 to 2007.

Funding
The SPLC is supported by contributions from student journalists, journalism educators, and other individuals, as well as by donations from foundations and corporations. On January 23, 2007, the SPLC  successfully completed a three-year $3.75 million endowment campaign, spurred by a challenge grant from the John S. and James L. Knight Foundation. In 2017, the organization's total revenue was $763,920, as shown on IRS Form 990.

See also 

 Censorship of student media in the United States

References

External links
 

Freedom of expression organizations
Organizations established in 1974
American journalism organizations